Hen Yanni (born January 20, 1983) is an Israeli actress, model and musician.

Personal life
Hen Yanni was born and raised in a suburb of Northern Israel, near Haifa, to a Jewish family. In 1998, when she was fifteen she participated in a beauty contest and was chosen to girl of the year by Maariv's youth magazine.

Career
She left home following a modeling career. During the years 1999-2003 she worked
as a model in Paris, New York City and London. She photographed to the magazines Italian Vogue, French Vogue, V Magazine, The Face and ID.
Her major campaigns includes companies like Paul & Joe, Dolce & Gabbana and Kenneth Cole. She was photographed by photographers like Craig McDean, David Sims and Mario Testino.	 

At the age of 21 she returned to Israel, and decided to be an actress. First she learned acting privately with Eyal Cohen,

afterwards she took a one-year preparatory course at Nissan Nativ Acting School, and three years studies at Yoram Levinshtein School of performing arts in Tel Aviv.

She made guest appearances in the television series The Arbitrator and My Trouble with Women.

Yanni played the major role in the feature film The Other War, directed by Tamar Glazerman. She played a supporting role in the feature film Melach Yam, directed by Itay Lev, where she made a Cover version to Shlomo Artzi's song "You will Never know". In 2012 she played a supporting role in Haim Buzaglo's feature film Blank Blank.

In 2011 she starred Doron Eran's film Melting Away, in which she played the lead role of a transgender person. 
Yanni played the role of Asaf, a boy who secretly wears women's clothes. When his parents (Limor Goldstein and Ami Weinberg) discover this, they throw him out of the house. Asaf goes through sex reassignment surgery and became Anna, a nightclub singer. When her father is dying of cancer, Anna's mother finds her through a private investigator. Anna returns to take care of her father under the guise of a nurse.
 In  Melting Away, she sings two songs, one of them is "Danny Boy".

Yanni won a breakthrough performance award at the LGBT Tel Aviv international Film Festival, was nominated for Israeli Academy award for best actress.

References

External links
 Hen Yanni's official site
 

1983 births
Living people
People from Kiryat Motzkin
Models from Haifa
Actresses from Haifa
Musicians from Haifa
Israeli film actresses
Israeli stage actresses
Israeli female models
21st-century Israeli women singers
Israeli DJs
21st-century Israeli actresses
Bisexual actresses
Bisexual musicians
Israeli bisexual people
Israeli LGBT actors
Israeli LGBT singers
LGBT models
LGBT DJs